Bundicks Branch is a  long 1st order tributary to Love Creek, in Sussex County, Delaware.

Variant names
According to the Geographic Names Information System, it has also been known historically as:  
Bundick's Creek

Course
Bundicks Branch rises on the Simpler Branch divide about 0.5 miles west of Anderson Corner in Sussex County, Delaware.  Bundicks Branch then flows generally east to meet Love Creek within Goslee Millpond.

Watershed
Bundicks Branch drains  of area, receives about 45.2 in/year of precipitation, has a topographic wetness index of 640.38 and is about 27.7% forested.

See also
List of rivers of Delaware

References 

Rivers of Delaware